The 1946 Nations Grand Prix was a Grand Prix motor race held in Geneva on 21 July 1946.

Classification

Final

Heat 1

Drivers in bold advanced to the final

 Pole position : Jean-Pierre Wimille, 1:37.5
 Fastest lap : Jean-Pierre Wimille, 1:47.2

Heat 2

Drivers in bold advanced to the final

 Pole position : Giuseppe Farina, 1:38.3
 Fastest lap : Giuseppe Farina, 1:42.3

Nations Grand Prix
Nations Grand Prix
Grand Prix race reports